Manny Pacquiao vs. Jorge Solís, billed as Blaze of Glory, was a super featherweight boxing match. The bout took place on April 14, 2007 at the Alamodome, San Antonio, Texas, United States and was distributed by Top Rank PPV.

Pacquiao had a slow start during the first few rounds as he's trying to adjust with Solis' height and reach advantage. He eventually controlled the pace of the fight and landed some flurries punches later on. In the sixth round, Pacquiao suffered a cut over his left eye due to an accidental clash of heads. Solis, on the other hand, had his nose bleeding through the seventh round. The fight ended in the eighth round via KO after Solis' second knockdown of the round.

A month after the fight, Pacquiao lost his congressional seat bid for the 1st district of South Cotabato in the 2007 Philippine general elections against the incumbent congresswoman Darlene Antonino-Custodio.

References

Solís
2007 in boxing
Boxing in Texas
2007 in sports in Texas
April 2007 sports events in the United States